Shelley House may refer to:

in England
Shelley House (London)

in the United States (by state then city)
Shelley House (Madison, Connecticut), listed on the National Register of Historic Places (NRHP) in New Haven County
Shelley-Tipton House, Garnett, Kansas, listed on the NRHP in Anderson County
William Francis Shelley House, Kansas City, Missouri, listed on the NRHP in Jackson County
Shelley House (St. Louis, Missouri), listed on the NRHP in St. Louis